Henri Zagwijn (17 July 1878 – 23 October 1954) was a Dutch composer.

Born in Nieuwer-Amstel, Zagwijn never received a formal musical education, instead being almost completely self-taught in composition. He was attracted to the style of the Impressionists and began to compose in a manner reflective of trends then current in France. He gained an appointment to teach at the Rotterdam School of Music in 1916; two years later, with Sem Dresden, he founded the Society of Modern Composers in the Netherlands. Later in his career he settled in The Hague, and from 1931 taught at the Rotterdam Conservatory. An anthroposophic disciple of Rudolf Steiner, he published De muziek in het licht der anthroposophie in 1935; in 1940 he published a life of Claude Debussy. Zagwijn died in The Hague. His compositional output consists largely of chamber music.

Selected works
1912: "Der Zauberlehrling" , ballad for tenor, baritone, chorus and orchestra
1926: "Musik zur Eurythmie" for piano
1932: "String Sextet"
1937: "Morgenzang" , a vocalise for soprano and ensemble
1938: "Vom Jahreslauf" for choir and orchestra, on a text by Rudolf Steiner
1939: "Concertante" for piano and orchestra
1941: "Concertante" for flute and orchestra
1941: "Mystère" for harp and piano
1946: "Concertante" for piano and orchestra
1948: "Concerto" for harp and orchestra
1949: "Ballade" for harp
pub. 1952:  (Paraphrases on two Dutch Folk Songs), for carillon
 pub. 1956:  (Variations on the Song "Schoon jonkvrouw ik moet u klagen"), for carillon
 pub. 1956: Vesper, for carillon

References

1878 births
1954 deaths
Anthroposophists
Composers for carillon
20th-century classical composers
20th-century Dutch musicians
20th-century Dutch male musicians
Dutch classical composers
Dutch male classical composers
People from Amstelveen